Nadezhda Sergeyevna Glyzina (née Fedotova; born 20 May 1988) is a Russian female water polo player. She was a member of the Russia women's national water polo team, playing as a driver. She was a part of the  team at the 2008 Summer Olympics, 2012 Summer Olympics and 2016 Summer Olympics. On club level she played for Kinef Kirishi in Russia.

See also
 Russia women's Olympic water polo team records and statistics
 List of Olympic medalists in water polo (women)
 List of players who have appeared in multiple women's Olympic water polo tournaments
 List of women's Olympic water polo tournament top goalscorers
 List of World Aquatics Championships medalists in water polo

References

External links
 

Russian female water polo players
1988 births
Living people
Olympic water polo players of Russia
Water polo players at the 2012 Summer Olympics
World Aquatics Championships medalists in water polo
Water polo players at the 2016 Summer Olympics
Olympic bronze medalists for Russia
Olympic medalists in water polo
Medalists at the 2016 Summer Olympics
Water polo players at the 2008 Summer Olympics
People from Kirishi
Water polo players at the 2020 Summer Olympics
Sportspeople from Leningrad Oblast
21st-century Russian women